William Arthur (Bill) Pritchard (April 3,1888 – October 23, 1981) was a  Canadian Marxist labour activist, organizer, editor, journalist, and politican. He also was one of the principal defendants in the1920 sedition trial of nine leaders of the 1919 Winnipeg General Strike. Pritchard later was elected reeve (mayor) of Burnaby, British Columbia, during the Great Depression.

Biography

Early years
Born in Salford, England, Pritchard attended school in Swinton.  His Welsh-born father, James Pritchard, emigrated to British Columbia in 1900, when Bill was 12 years old. While working as a miner in Canada, James Pritchard became a socialist activist, splitting from the reformist Socialist Party of British Columbia in 1902 to help found the short-lived Revolutionary Socialist Party of Canada before joining the broader movement again as a founding member of the Socialist Party of Canada (SPC) in January 1905.

Back home in England the Pritchard family's financial situation remained difficult. Bill Pritchard's schooling came to an end shortly before his 13th birthday when he was apprenticed to a Lancashire building contractor so that he might help support his family while learning the construction trades. Pritchard nevertheless attended night school over the next seven years at two technical institutes, where he gained formal training.

In 1911 Pritchard's father returned home from Canada for a short visit. The 23-year-old decided to join his father on the return trip to North America, sailing with him across the ocean before traversing the breadth of Canada by rail to Vancouver on Canada's Pacific coast. The pair arrived in Vancouver on May 19, 1911, and immediately went to meet with party leader E. T. Kingsley at the office of the Western Clarion, the weekly newspaper of the SPC. Two days later Bill Pritchard attended his first socialist meeting and before the month was out, he was admitted as a card-carrying member of the SPC.

1919 Winnipeg General Strike 
The strike originated from social inequalities along with poor working conditions. It resulted in numerous arrests and two deaths from police shootings. Nevertheless, the confrontation significantly contributed to the evolution of the labour movement and social democratic politics.

Pritchard was a key historical figure in the strike. As well as being one of the strike leaders, he pursued social and cultural goals. He was put on trial and found guilty of seditious conspiracy in March 1920 and sentenced to one year in prison. Pritchard's wife, whom he had married in 1913 and was also an SPC activist, ran for office in the 1920 Manitoba election while he was imprisoned.

Pritchard also played a major role in the founding of the One Big Union movement in 1919.

Later political career
Pritchard's career in electoral politics began after 1925, when the SPC disbanded.

In 1926, he ran as an Independent labour candidate in the federal constituency of  New Westminster, promising workers and farmers a war on poverty in contrast to the personal partisanship of Arthur Meighen and Mackenzie King. He was defeated, but did win certain polls—such as the railway worker community of Port Mann.   

A concentration of labour voters in North Burnaby, where Pritchard had settled in 1922, was identified and effectively used by him in his subsequent campaigns for municipal office. Elected to Burnaby council in 1928, he gained the confidence of North Ward voters by advocating for planned community development. He then gambled, successfully, on a bid for the reeve of Burnaby, just as the Depression arrived in the winter of 1929–30.

1930s Burnaby Reeveship
Pritchard soon emerged as a champion for local relief issues vis-à-vis senior governments, and was rewarded by a landslide majority (66 per cent) in his last municipal race (January 1932.)   On his political watch, Burnaby gained unprecedented profile as a laboratory, real or imagined, of socialist innovation. (A garbled report in the New York Times was headlined "Town Dispenses With Money; All Debts Paid with Labor.")  Although local co-operators had some success in building an alternative economy, municipal debts, as such, could scarcely be addressed through such means. After lengthy debate, a symbolic repudiation of municipal debt (a $25 bond payment in late 1932) triggered provincial receivership of the errant municipality. This move is known to have been well received in Conservative circles in Ottawa, where Pritchard was a persona non grata and Burnaby at large had become a strangely significant political headache.

Pritchard joined the Co-operative Commonwealth Federation, but he did not win elected office under that banner. He also failed in a bid to transform the party's provincial newspaper, The Commonwealth, which he edited during the mid-1930s, into a commercially viable newspaper.

After the death of his daughter in 1938, Pritchard moved to Los Angeles, California, where he was active in the World Socialist Party of the United States.

He died on October 23, 1981.

References

Further reading
 Campbell, Peter. 1992. "'Making Socialists': Bill Pritchard, the Socialist Party of Canada, and the Third International," Labour/ Le Travail, 30: 45–63.
 Campbell, Peter. 1996. "Bill Pritchard's Propaganda Tour of Alberta, Winter 1915-16," Labour/ Le Travail, 37: 265–274. 
 Campbell, Peter. 1999. Canadian Marxists and the Search for a Third Way. McGill-Queen's University Press.
 Gutkin, Harry, & Mildred Gutkin. 1997. Profiles in Dissent: The Shaping of Radical Thought in the West. NeWest Press.
 McKay, Ian. 2008. Reasoning Otherwise: Leftists and the People's Enlightenment in Canada,1890-1920. Between the Lines.
 Naylor, James, & Tom Mitchell. 2019. "The Speech Bill Pritchard Never Gave." Labour/Le Travail, 84: 279-301.
 Newell, Peter E.  2008. The Impossibilists: A Brief History of the Socialist Party of Canada. Athena Press.
 Pritchard, William A. Reminiscences of the Old Socialist Party of Canada and His Connections Therewith . Socialist Party of Canada. Transcript of an oral memoir, Los Angeles, 1973.

External links

Memorable Manitobans: William Arthur “Bill” Pritchard (1888-1981)
Heritage Burnaby Various oral histories; Interview with William Pritchard & Norman Penner by Lawrence Fast (1973); Open meeting with William Pritchard & Norman Penner (1973); Troubled Times: Burnaby in the 1930s (video, 2018); Pritchard photos (1930, 1932). 

1888 births
1981 deaths
Canadian Marxists
Canadian socialists
People of the Winnipeg general strike
British emigrants to Canada